Anders Martinus Petersen (13 July 1876 – 8 December 1968) was a Danish sport shooter who competed in the 1920 Summer Olympics. In 1920 he won the gold medal as member of the Danish team in the team 300 metre military rifle, standing event. In the individual 300 metre military rifle, standing event he finished seventh.

References

External links
profile

1968 deaths
1876 births
Danish male sport shooters
ISSF rifle shooters
Olympic shooters of Denmark
Shooters at the 1920 Summer Olympics
Olympic gold medalists for Denmark
Olympic medalists in shooting
Medalists at the 1920 Summer Olympics